"The Way You Used to Do" is the first single from the Queens of the Stone Age album Villains. The single was released on June 15, 2017. The song is featured in the soundtrack of the 2017 racing video game Need for Speed Payback.

Rolling Stone described the song as "grisly and jumping".

Background
"The Way You Used to Do" was first released on June 15, 2017. A music video, directed by Jonas Åkerlund, was released on August 15, 2017.

Charts

Weekly charts

Year-end charts

Certifications

References

2017 songs
Songs written by Josh Homme
Queens of the Stone Age songs
2017 singles
Song recordings produced by Mark Ronson
Matador Records singles
Music videos directed by Jonas Åkerlund
Songs written by Troy Van Leeuwen
Songs written by Dean Fertita
Songs written by Michael Shuman